The Nigerian Communications Commission (NCC) is the independent regulatory authority for the telecommunications industry in Nigeria. The NCC was created under Decree number 75 by the Federal Military Government of Nigeria on 24 November 1992. The NCC was charged with the responsibility of regulating the supply of telecommunications services and facilities, promoting competition, and setting performance standards for telephone services in Nigeria. The Decree has been abrogated and replaced with the Nigerian Communications Act (NCA) 2003. Umar Garba is the present head of (NCC) assumed office since 2015.

Notes

External links
 Official website
 NCC Information Portal

Communications in Nigeria
Regulation in Nigeria
Government agencies established in 1992
1992 establishments in Nigeria
Communications authorities